All Star Sessions is an album by saxophonist Gene Ammons recorded between 1950 and 1955 and released on the Prestige label.

Reception

The Allmusic review by Stewart Mason stated: "A bop classic, All-Star Session was the recording debut of Gene Ammons as a leader with his group the Gene Ammons All-Stars, featuring his fellow tenor saxophonist Sonny Stitt... Those looking to explore Stitt and Ammons' enormous catalogs (both together and separately) could do much worse than starting right here".

Track listing 
All compositions by Gene Ammons and Sonny Stitt, except where indicated.
 "Woofin' and Tweetin'" (Gene Ammons) – 15:05    
 "Juggernaut" (Ammons) – 10:28    
 "Blues Up and Down" [take 3] – 2:39    
 "Blues Up and Down" [take 1] – 1:28 Bonus track on CD reissue    
 "Blues Up and Down" [take 2] – 2:23 Bonus track on CD reissue     
 "You Can Depend on Me" [take 1] (Charlie Carpenter, Louis Dunlap, Earl Hines) –  2:50    
 "You Can Depend on Me" [take 2] (Carpenter, Dunlap, Hines) – 2:50 Bonus track on CD reissue     
 "Stringin' the Jug" – 5:05    
 "New Blues Up and Down" – 5:07    
 "Bye Bye" (Jimmy Mundy) – 3:02 Bonus track on CD reissue     
 "When I Dream of You" (Carpenter, Hines) – 2:55 Bonus track on CD reissue     
 "A Lover Is Blue" (Carpenter, Mundy, James Oliver Young) – 2:46

Note
Recorded in New York City on March 5, 1950 (tracks 3-7 & 10), October 28, 1950 (tracks 8, 11 & 12), January 31, 1951 (track 9) and at Van Gelder Studio in Hackensack New Jersey on June 15, 1955 (tracks 1 & 2)

Personnel 
Gene Ammons – tenor saxophone, baritone saxophone 
Sonny Stitt – tenor saxophone, baritone saxophone (tracks 3-10) 
Art Farmer (tracks 1 & 2), Billy Massey (tracks 9 & 10) – trumpet 
Chippy Outcalt – trombone (track 9)  
Lou Donaldson – alto saxophone (tracks 1 & 2)
Charlie Bateman (track 9), Duke Jordan (tracks 3-7 & 10), Junior Mance (track 8, 11 & 12), Freddie Redd (tracks 1 & 2) – piano
Addison Farmer (tracks 1 & 2), Tommy Potter (tracks 3-7 & 10), Gene Wright (tracks 8, 9, 11 & 12) – bass
Art Blakey (track 9), Kenny Clarke (tracks 1 & 2), Jo Jones (tracks 3-7 & 10), Wes Landers (tracks 8, 11 & 12) – drums 
Larry Townsend – vocals (track 9)

References 

Gene Ammons albums
1956 albums
Prestige Records albums
Albums produced by Bob Weinstock
Albums recorded at Van Gelder Studio